Harborfields High School is a four-year secondary school located in Greenlawn, New York, United States.  It functions as the sole high school for Harborfields Central School District, encompassing the communities of Centerport and Greenlawn along with parts of Huntington and Northport.  In 2011, the school was ranked 88th on Newsweeks list of Top 1300 High Schools in America.

The Class of 1960 was the first graduating class, with about 130 graduates from Centerport and Greenlawn only. That first class used the building for four years as it was being completed. 

The name Harborfields came from a combination of the older names of Centerport (Little Cow Harbor) and Greenlawn (Old Fields), selected from an entry in a naming contest in about 1958.

Harborfields High School can be seen in Mariah Carey's documentary "Mariah Carey's Homecoming" which aired on December 14, 1999 on Fox.

Athletics
Harborfields' sports team is known as the Tornadoes. Its colors are dark green and white.
Harborfields offers the following sports:

 Varsity Baseball
 Varsity Basketball
 Varsity Bowling
 Varsity Cheer
 Varsity Cross Country
 Varsity Field Hockey
 Varsity / JV Football
 Varsity Golf
 Varsity Gymnastics
 Varsity Indoor Track and Field
 Varsity Lacrosse
 Varsity Soccer
 Varsity Softball
 Varsity Swimming
 Varsity Tennis
 Varsity Track and Field
 Varsity Volleyball
 Varsity Wrestling

Notable alumni
 Mariah Carey, singer-songwriter-producer and actress
 Brian "Mitts" Daniels, Madball guitarist
 Mike Fagan, professional bowler
 John J. Flanagan, Republican New York state senator
 Jeff Hawkins, inventor of the Palm Pilot and co-founder of Palm Computing.
 Gregg "Opie" Hughes, radio host
 Brittany Lauda, voice actress and director
 Mark Millon, former All-World lacrosse player
 Sara Whalen (born 1976), Olympic medalist soccer player
 Buzzy Feiten, guitarist, inventor

References

External links 
 Harborfields High School website
 Harborfields High School report card provided by NYSED
 Harborfields High School profile provided by schooltree.org

Public high schools in New York (state)
Huntington, New York
Schools in Suffolk County, New York